"All Over" is the debut solo single of So Solid Crew member Lisa Maffia, taken from her debut solo album, First Lady (2003). It was released on 21 April 2003. In the United Kingdom, it spent three weeks within the top 10 of the UK Singles Chart, peaking at number two and spending 12 weeks on the chart. It was the 85th-best-selling single of 2003 in the UK. Outside the UK, "All Over" reached number 23 in New Zealand and peaked inside the top 50 in Australia and the Netherlands.

Track listings

UK CD1
 "All Over" (edit version)
 "All Over" (full length version)
 "Nightcrawler"
 "All Over" (video)

UK CD2
 "All Over" (edit version)
 "All Over" (remix)
 "Out of My Life"

UK 12-inch single
A1. "All Over" (full length version)
A2. "All Over" (remix)
B1. "Nightcrawler"

European CD single
 "All Over" (edit version)
 "All Over" (Jiggy Joint re-edited video)

European maxi-CD single
 "All Over" (Jiggy Joint radio remix)
 "All Over" (edit version)
 "All Over" (remix)
 "All Over" (Jiggy Joint re-edited video)

Australian CD single
 "All Over" (edit version)
 "All Over" (full length version)
 "All Over" (remix)
 "All Over" (Jiggy Joint remix)
 "Nightcrawler"

Charts

Weekly charts

Year-end charts

Release history

References

2003 debut singles
2003 songs
Independiente (record label) singles
Lisa Maffia songs
Sony Music Australia singles